The Dan Hodge Trophy is awarded each year to the United States of America’s best college wrestler. The trophy is presented at the end of the season by W.I.N. Magazine (Wrestling Insider Newsmagazine) and Culture House. It is the collegiate wrestling equivalent to the Heisman Trophy in college football. 

The Hodge Trophy is named after Danny Hodge, a three–time NCAA champion for the University of Oklahoma from 1955 to 1957. The Hodge Trophy was created by Mike Chapman, founder of WIN magazine and Culture House, a company that produces books and posters. The first winner was T.J. Jaworsky, a three–time NCAA Division I National champion from the University of North Carolina at Chapel Hill in 1995.

There have been six multiple winners of the Hodge Trophy. The first was Iowa State's legend Cael Sanderson, who won the award three times in his run as the first four–time NCAA champion, the second was Ben Askren from Missouri, who won the award two times, the third and fourth were David Taylor and Zain Retherford respectively, both from Penn State, who won the award two times, the fifth is Spencer Lee from Iowa, who remains to have a year of eligibility left, and the latest and sixth one is Gable Steveson, who won the award two times, being the only heavyweight to do so.

Award criteria
The trophy is awarded based on seven criteria;

 Record
 Number of pins
 Dominance
 Past credentials
 Quality of competition
 Sportsmanship/Citizenship
 Heart

Winners 

* Number of first place ballot votes from the Hodge Committee is indicated in parentheses

** In 2001 and 2021, the Dan Hodge Trophy was shared by two co-winners

See also
National Wrestling Hall of Fame and Museum

References

External links

 Dan Hodge Trophy Website at Win Magazine
"Bing Images" (photos) of the Dan Hodge Trophy (Microsoft)
National Wrestling Hall of Fame Dan Gable Museum website ("Glen Brand Wrestling Hall of Fame of Iowa") (publisher: Dan Gable International Wrestling Institute and Museum)

College wrestling in the United States
College sports trophies and awards in the United States
Most valuable player awards
Awards established in 1995